Malcolm Bennett, a Fellow of the Royal Society, is Professor of Plant Science at the University of Nottingham.

Education and career 
He obtained his BSc in biochemistry with Molecular Biology from the University of Manchester Institute of Science and Technology in 1985 His PhD was from the University of Warwick in 1989. Bennett has held a number of prestigious fellowships including a BBSRC Professorial Research Fellowship, a European Research Council Advanced Investigator Fellowship and a Royal Society Wolfson Research Fellowship. In 2020 he was elected to Fellowship of the Royal Society.

Bennett's research is focused on the ’hidden half of plants,’ exploring how roots grow, develop and adapt to their soil environment. His group has characterised many of the regulatory signals, genes and molecular mechanisms that control root growth and developmental responses. Bennett is co-director of the Hounsfield Facility which uses X-ray based microCT to non-invasively image roots in soil.

Bennett has published more than 200 articles in scientific journals.

Selected publications

References 

Living people
Year of birth missing (living people)
Academics of the University of Nottingham
Fellows of the Royal Society
British scientists